Xestorrhytias is an extinct genus of mastodonsauroid temnospondyl within the family Mastodonsauridae. They were amphibious carnivores.

See also
 Prehistoric amphibian
 List of prehistoric amphibians

References

Stereospondyls
Taxa named by Christian Erich Hermann von Meyer
Fossil taxa described in 1842